Progressive Voices was an electoral alliance formed by More for Mallorca (Més), More for Menorca (MpM), Now Eivissa (Ara Eivissa) and Republican Left of Catalonia (ERC) to contest the April 2019 Spanish general election in the Balearic Islands. Guillem Balboa, then mayor of Alaró, headed the candidacy, which did not win any seat with a score of less than 5% of the valid votes.

In the Senate, in the constituency of Mallorca, Més and ERC ran in coalition with We Can (Podemos) and United Left of the Balearic Islands (EUIB), styling it as Unidas Podemos Veus Progressistes, as a repetition of the 2016 coalition United We Can–More. However, in Menorca, MpM ran alone, as did Ara in the Ibiza–Formentera constituency. None of the candidacies obtained any seat.

Composition

Electoral performance

Cortes Generales

References

External links
 Veus Progressistes

Political parties in the Balearic Islands
Defunct political party alliances in Spain
Political parties established in 2019
2019 establishments in Spain